
This is a list of public art in Newport, South Wales.

Public art formerly in Newport

References

Bibliography

External links
 
 Public art in Newport, Newport City Council

Culture in Newport, Wales
Newport
public art